Damoh Assembly constituency is one of the 230 Vidhan Sabha (Legislative Assembly) constituencies of Madhya Pradesh state in central India. This constituency came into existence in 1951, as one of the Vidhan Sabha constituencies of Madhya Pradesh state.

Overview
Damoh (constituency number 55) is one of the 4 Vidhan Sabha constituencies located in Damoh district. This constituency covers the Damoh municipality and part of Damoh tehsil of the district.

Damoh is part of Damoh Lok Sabha constituency along with seven other Vidhan Sabha segments, namely, Pathariya, Jabera and Hatta in this district, Deori, Rehli and Banda in Sagar district and Malhara in Chhatarpur district.

Members of Legislative Assembly

 By-election due to Rahul Lodhi resigning from the Congress party, to join the BJP

Election results

2021 By-election

External links
 Election Commission of India Partywise Comparison Since 197753 - Damoh Assembly Constituency http://eci.nic.in/eci_main/electionanalysis/AE/S12/partycomp53.htm
 Damoh Constituency https://web.archive.org/web/20131216215741/http://www.madhyabharat.in/politics/constituencies/damoh.htm

References

Damoh district
Assembly constituencies of Madhya Pradesh